Kansas City, Missouri was granted a charter franchise in the American Basketball Association in February 1967.

History
Kansas City's first pro basketball team was the Kansas City Blues of the ill-fated Professional Basketball League of America in 1947; the league folded within a month, and the Blues played only six games. In 1961, the American Basketball League was formed; one of its teams were the Kansas City Steers, who qualified for the ABL's first (and only) championship series in 1962, which they lost to the Cleveland Pipers. The Steers and the ABL returned for the 1962-63 season, but the league folded on the last day of 1962; the Steers, with a 22-9 record, were considered unofficial champions of the truncated season.

On February 2, 1967, the ABA was created with eleven charter teams, including an unnamed Kansas City franchise.  The Kansas City team was awarded for $35,000 to James B. Trindle; on March 27, 1967, Vince Boryla was named general manager.

But the club had problems finding an arena to host their games in Kansas City. Municipal Auditorium, which had hosted Blues and Steers games, had just been awarded a Central Hockey League franchise, which was to be the top farm club of the NHL's expansion St. Louis Blues, thus limiting its available home dates. So, on April 1, 1967, the team was relocated to Denver and named the Denver Larks.

Meanwhile, Trindle's financial problems lead Boryla to resign; ultimately, the team was sold to J. William Ringsby, who soon renamed the team the Denver Rockets in homage to his trucking business, Rocket Truck Lines. The Denver Rockets played in the ABA from 1967 through 1974, when they became the Denver Nuggets and played as such through the ABA's final two seasons. With the ABA-NBA merger in 1976, the Nuggets joined the NBA and continue to play in that league to the present day.

Subsequent events
Professional basketball returned to Kansas City in 1972 when the Cincinnati Royals relocated there and became the Kansas City Kings. The Kings left for Sacramento, California in 1985 and Kansas City has been without an NBA franchise since then. The city has had several teams in the semi-pro, 21st-century version of the American Basketball Association, including the Kansas City Knights, who won the ABA crown in 2002.

References

External links

RememberTheABA.com page on the team

American Basketball Association teams
Denver Nuggets
Basketball teams in Missouri
Sports in the Kansas City metropolitan area
Basketball teams established in 1967
Sports clubs disestablished in 1967
1967 establishments in Missouri
1967 disestablishments in Missouri
Basketball teams disestablished in 1967